James Glendinning (September 19, 1866 – June 8, 1939) was an American politician who served as the Mayor of Salt Lake City from 1896 to 1897.

References

1866 births
1939 deaths
Mayors of Salt Lake City
People from Jersey City, New Jersey